Rushden is a small village and civil parish which forms part of the grouped parish council of Rushden and Wallington in the North Hertfordshire district, in the county of Hertfordshire, England. Rushden is located just off the A507 between Baldock and Buntingford.

Notable residents
 Sir Thomas Stanley (1625 in Cumberlow – 1678) an English author and translator.
 Percy Portsmouth, (1874–1953) sculptor, retired to "Youngloves" in Rushden.

References

External links

 Rushden Community Website

Villages in Hertfordshire
Civil parishes in Hertfordshire
North Hertfordshire District